Moussa El-Hage (born on 19 February 1954, in Aintoura, Lebanon), is a Maronite Catholic eparch, now Archbishop of the Archeparchy of Haifa and the Holy Land and Patriarchal Exarch of Jerusalem and Palestine and Jordan.

Life
Moussa El-Hage joined the Maronite religious Antonin Maronite Order in 1972, making vows in 1979, receiving holy orders on 14 August 1980.

He studied Philosophy and Theology at the Pontifical University of St. Thomas Aquinas and Biblical Theology in Studium Biblicum Franciscanum (part of the Pontifical University Antonianum), and is a PhD in Oriental Studies and Liturgy at the Pontifical Oriental Institute. In addition to Arabic, El-Hage speaks English, French and Italian; and knows the languages Syriac, Greek, Hebrew and Aramaic.

After being ordained, he received several orders in the Maronite pastoral mission in southern Lebanon (until 1985), and was rector of the seminary of St. Anthony of Padua in Karmsadi. Later he carried out several positions in your order, as well as the University Antonian. Back in Lebanon, was abbot of the monasteries of Saint Sergius and Saint Bacchus in Ihdin and Sarurta.

Episcopate

On June 16, 2012 Pope Benedict XVI confirmed his appointment as Patriarchal Exarch of Jerusalem and Palestine and Jordan, as well as Archbishop of Haifa and the Holy Land. He was consecrated bishop on 28 July of the same year, by Maronite Patriarch of Antioch, Bechara Boutros al-Rahi, as principal consecrator. His co-consecrators were Samir Mazloum, Titular bishop of Callinicum dei Maroniti, Guy-Paul Noujaim, Titular Bishop of Caesarea Philippi, Paul Youssef Matar, Archeparch of Beirut, Francis Némé Baïssari, Titular Bishop of Aradus, Paul Nabil El-Sayah, Curial Bishop of Antioch, Joseph Mohsen Béchara, Emeritus Eparch of Antelias, Simon Atallah, Eparch of Baalbek-Deir El-Ahmar, François Eid, OMM, Emeritus Eparch of Cairo, Edgard Madi, Eparch of Nossa Senhora do Líbano em São Paulo, and Michel Aoun, Eparch of Byblos.

On January 27, 2014 Pope Francis named him apostolic administrator of Melkite Greek Catholic Archeparchy of Akka of Greek-Melkites after the resignation of the holder Elias Chacour.

El-Hage is a member of the Biblical Commission (since 1993) and liturgical (since 2011) of the Maronite Patriarchate.

References

External links
 http://www.catholic-hierarchy.org/bishop/blehagem.html
 http://www.gcatholic.org/dioceses/diocese/haif0.htm

21st-century Maronite Catholic bishops
1954 births
Lebanese Maronites
Members of Catholic orders and societies
Pontifical University of Saint Thomas Aquinas alumni
Pontifical Oriental Institute alumni
Living people
People from Keserwan District